Viktor Riznychenko (born 21 June 2002) is a Ukrainian professional footballer who plays for Hungarian club Kisvárda II.

Career statistics
.

References

External links
 
 

2002 births
Living people
Ukrainian footballers
Ukrainian expatriate footballers
Association football midfielders
Kisvárda FC players
Nemzeti Bajnokság I players
Expatriate footballers in Hungary
Ukrainian expatriate sportspeople in Hungary